The 1998 Big Sky Conference men's basketball tournament was held March 5–7 at the Walkup Skydome at Northern Arizona University in Flagstaff, Arizona.

Top-seeded host Northern Arizona easily defeated  in the championship game,  to win their first Big Sky men's basketball tournament title.

Format
No new teams were added and membership remained at nine. As a transitioning Division I member, Portland State was not eligible for this year's Big Sky tournament.

Similar to the previous year, the top six teams in the regular season conference standings participated in the tournament. The top two earned byes into the semifinals while the remaining four played in the quarterfinals. The lowest remaining seed met the top seed in the semifinals.

Bracket

NCAA tournament
Northern Arizona received the automatic bid to the NCAA tournament, their first appearance in the Division I tournament. No other Big Sky members were invited or to  The Lumberjacks were seeded fifteenth in the West regional and lost by three points to Cincinnati in the first round in Boise.

See also
Big Sky Conference women's basketball tournament

References

Big Sky Conference men's basketball tournament
Tournament
Big Sky Conference men's basketball tournament
Big Sky Conference men's basketball tournament
Basketball competitions in Arizona
Flagstaff, Arizona
College sports tournaments in Arizona